Aguada de Baixo was a freguesia ("civil parish") in Águeda Municipality, Aveiro District, Portugal. It had an area of 4.7 km2 and in 2011 had a population of 1373. In 2013 it was merged with Barrô as part of an administrative reorganization of the territory and formed the União das Freguesias de Barrô e Aguada de Baixo.

Geography 
It was the southernmost freguesia of the municipality, and it bordered the Águeda freguesias of Barrô and Aguada de Cima and the municipalities of Anadia e Oliveira do Bairro.

Places 
 Aguadela
 Alto da Póvoa
 Bicarenho
 Landiosa
 Passadouro
 Povoa da Raposa
 Povoa do Nascido
 Vale do Grou
 Vale do Mouro
 Vidoeiro

Demography

Politics

Elections 
As of 31 December 2011, it had 1532 registered voters. In the 2009 local elections for the Assembly of the Freguesia, there were 1598 registered voters, with 920 (57,57%) voting and 678 (42,43%) abstaining. The Lista Independente de Aguada de Baixo (LIAB) got 527 (57,28%) of the votes, electing five members of the Assembly and the Socialist Party (PS) got 364 votes (39,57%), electing four members of the Assembly.

Religion 
The Portuguese Roman Catholic Church's Diocese of Aveiro includes the Parish of Aguada de Baixo as part of the archpriestship of Águeda.

Notes 
Article based on the Portuguese Wikipedia article Aguada de Baixo.

References 

Former parishes of Águeda
2013 disestablishments in Portugal
Populated places disestablished in 2013